Ralph Rubio may refer to:
 Ralph Rubio, owner of Rubio's Coastal Grill
 Ralph Rubio (mayor), American politician who served as the first Latino mayor of Seaside, California